Alicia Hall (born December 2, 1985) is an American model who won NBC's 2005 reality TV show Sports Illustrated Swimsuit Model Search.

Early life 

Hall was raised in Las Vegas, Nevada, and by the age of seven, becoming a swimsuit model was her lifelong career goal.  Once she was old enough, Hall began appearing in local fashion shows. At the age of 13, encouraged by her mother and stepfather, she participated in her first professional photo shoot in October 1998 before winning a competition held by the John Robert Powers School, a well-established Las Vegas modeling institution where she then received formal training while working as a freelance web designer.

Career 

In January 2003, Hall competed on CBS's revival of Star Search, making it as far as the semi-finals in the model category.

Hall again took the reality TV path when she was chosen from thousands of applicants to be one of the 12 finalists on series Sports Illustrated Swimsuit Model Search, which pitted aspiring models against one another in a six-episode modeling competition for a $1-million modeling contract with NEXT Model Management and a spread in Sports Illustrateds annual Swimsuit Issue.  Hall made it to the final two, along with Shannon Hughes, and subsequently won.

She has since modeled for Skechers and is currently signed with Elite Model Management in Miami and Los Angeles, Chic Model Management in Australia, DCM Models in Seoul, Satoru Models in Japan, Major Model Management in Paris, and Race Model Management in New York.

In 2009, Hall auditioned online for the Victoria's Secret Model Search. She was selected as one of the top 10 finalists that competed to walk in the 2009 Victoria's Secret Fashion Show. Though Hall garnered substantial praise during the competition's first task, a lingerie shoot with photographer Russell James, she struggled during the second task workout with personal trainer David Kirsh and ultimately lost to fellow competitors Kylie Bisutti and Jamie Lee Darley.

She featured in the video of Egyptian singer Amr Diab's song Wayah.

References

External links
 

1985 births
Living people
People from the Las Vegas Valley
Place of birth missing (living people)
Reality modeling competition winners
Female models from Nevada
Web designers
21st-century American women